Luke Romyn (born 1975) is an Amazon.com and USA Today-bestselling Australian author of action thriller novels published in America and author of the highly acclaimed best-selling novel The Dark Path. Luke has since completed several more books with Blacklisted, The Prometheus Wars series, The Legacy Chronicles saga, Ryder series, Walking with Shadows, and Trinity also available. He has since gone on to become a top 100 bestseller on Amazon, a #1 bestselling author in action and adventure on Amazon, and a USA Today bestselling author.

A former bodyguard and nightclub bouncer, Romyn's writing contains high levels of action and depth of insight into the criminal mind, derived from many years dealing and working with society's lower levels. Luke Romyn is one of the most followed social media personalities on Twitter in Australia, with over 400,000 followers.

Biography 

Born in Sydney, Luke Romyn's love of writing was evident from an early age. His first foray into writing was at the age of twelve with a short story titled, "Vesuvius, 79 AD!" and saw him recognized at a state level.

After the death of his father in Fiji, Romyn's teen years were fraught with cases of him being in trouble with the law, starkly contrasted by him excelling in school work, which he professed often bored him. After finishing high school, Romyn landed a job as a nightclub bouncer which turned into a career as a contract security operator, taking him to various countries in roles as diverse as security for Disney stage shows to close protection for television and film stars, both Australian and international.

References

External links 
 Luke Romyn's Website
 Luke Romyn's Blog
 Twitter account for Luke Romyn
 Luke Romyn Amazon Author Page

1975 births
Living people
Australian male novelists
Bodyguards
Writers from Sydney